= Delmues, Nevada =

- Ghost town
- Location within Nevada Location within the United States
- Coordinates: 37°52′00″N 114°19′01″W
- Country: United States
- State: Nevada
- County: Lincoln
- Elevation: 5,115 ft (1,559 m)

Delmues was a non-agency station on the Pioche branch of the Union Pacific railroad located in Lincoln County, in the U.S. state of Nevada.

Name variations included Delmue, Delmues Station and Engadine.

== History ==
The community was named after Joseph D. Delmue, who operated a ranch at the site in the 1870s.

During the Great Depression, a Civilian Conservation Corp was located at Delmues ranch.
